Cor or COR may refer to:

People
 Cor people, an ethnic group of Vietnam
 Cor (given name), including a list of people with the name
 Jon Cor (born 1984), a Canadian actor

Places
 Cor, Templeport, a townland in County Cavan, Ireland
 California State Prison, Corcoran, Kings County, California, U.S.
 Ingeniero Aeronáutico Ambrosio L.V. Taravella International Airport, Córdoba, Argentina, IATA airport code COR
 Corby railway station, UK, station code COR
 Corio railway station, Victoria, Australia, station code COR
 County Cork, Ireland, Chapman code COR

Business and organizations
 College of Radiographers (CoR), a charitable subsidiary of the Society of Radiographers
 Committee of the Regions (CoR), the European Union's assembly of local and regional representatives
 Commonwealth Oil Refineries, an Australian oil company 1920–1952 
 Confederation of Regions Party of Canada (CoR), Canadian political party
 Contracting Officer's Technical Representative, or Contracting Officer's Representative, in U.S. government procurement
 Kashruth Council of Canada, known as COR, a Canadian kosher certification agency
 Championship Off-Road (COR), an American off-road racing series

Languages
 Cor, a dialect of Cua language (Austroasiatic)
Cornish language, ISO 639-2/3 language code cor

Other uses
 COR or Korea Team, IOC country code for Korea
 cor, a "Technical Corrigendum" for ISO standards, see International Organization for Standardization
 Cor!!, a British comic book
 Coefficient of restitution, the ratio of the final to initial relative velocity between two objects after they collide
 Coronatine, a toxin
 Colorado Rush, a former name of USL W-League women's soccer team Real Colorado Cougars
 Cor (album), by Brazilian duo Anavitória
 Comando per le Operazioni in Rete, Italian cyberwarfare military unit

See also
 Cor blimey (disambiguation)
 Cor Jesu (disambiguation)
 Epistles to the Corinthians (disambiguation)
 Cor anglais, woodwind instrument
 Cor bovinum and Cor triatriatum, heart disease and defect
 Cor Caroli and Cor Hydrae, stars
 Côr Cymru, Welsh choir competition
 Cor Scorpii, Norwegian metal band
 Cor Serpentis, 1958 science fiction short story
 Pontifical Council Cor Unum, former Roman Catholic organisation
 Heart-nosed bat, Cardioderma cor